Alvar Kraft (1901–1959) was a Swedish composer. He was married to the actress Bullan Weijden.

Selected filmography
 Bashful Anton (1940)
 A Sailor on Horseback (1940)
 Sunny Sunberg (1941)
 Sun Over Klara (1942)
 Life in the Country (1943)
 Turn of the Century (1944)
 The Happy Tailor (1945)
 The Bells of the Old Town (1946)
 Jens Mansson in America (1947)
 Each Heart Has Its Own Story (1948)

References

Bibliography 
Qvist, Per Olov & von Bagh, Peter. Guide to the Cinema of Sweden and Finland. Greenwood Publishing Group, 2000.

External links 

1901 births
1959 deaths
Swedish composers
Swedish male composers
20th-century Swedish male musicians